Soleil FC are a Beninese football club based in Cotonou. They currently play in the Benin Premier League for season 2011–12.

Football clubs in Benin